Vashi may refer to:

Places in India
 Vashi, subunit of Navi Mumbai township, Mumbai (Bombay), Maharashtra
 Vashi, Raigad, village in Pen Taluka, Raigad District, Maharashtra
 Vashi, Sangli, village in Walwa Taluka, Sangli District, Maharashtra

People
 Vashi Dominguez, Spanish businessman
 Ami Vashi, Indian beauty queen and model, Miss India World 2003
 Victor Vashi (died ~1990), Hungarian political cartoonist

See also
 Vashi Bridge, a bridge in Mumbai (Bombay), Maharashtra
 Vashi railway station, a station in Mumbai (Bombay), Maharashtra
 Vashind, census town in Thane District, Maharashtra
 Tangeh Savashi (Tangeh Vashi), gorge in the Alborz range, Iran
 Washi (disambiguation)
 Vasi (disambiguation)